Mangalore, Mangaluru in Kannada, Kudla in Tulu, Kodiyāl  in Konkani, Maikāla in Beary bashe and Mangalapuram in Malayalam) is the chief port city and a commercial-industrial-educational hub of the Indian state of Karnataka.

Mangalore city has many skyscrapers, including some of the tallest in South India. It is developing like Mumbai and Dubai of South India, in terms of skyscrapers and highrises.

Mangalore lies between the Arabian Sea and the Western Ghat mountain ranges, and is the administrative headquarters of the Dakshina Kannada (formerly South Canara) district in south western Karnataka. With its pristine beaches, broad roads and calm localities this coastal city was declared the eighth cleanest city in India in 2010. Mangalore is one of the biggest commercial-industrial hubs of South India. It is the richest city in Karnataka after Bangalore. Mangalore ranked India's 13th place in top business destination and in Karnataka its second after Bangalore.

Tallest buildings (completed and topped-out buildings) 

This lists ranks buildings in Mangalore that stand at least  or 20 floors tall (including basements and ground floors), based on standard height measurement. This includes spires and architectural details, and also the height of the building below the ground, but does not include antenna masts. Only completed buildings and under-construction buildings that have been topped out are included.

Please note the following indications:
G - Ground floor
B - Basement floors
LB - Lower basement
UB - Upper basement
P - Podium floors
S - Stilt floors
SF - Service floors
VP - Vehicle Parking floors
UF - Upper floors
T - Terrace floors/top floors (structurally enclosed, but uninhabited)

Under construction and Approved buildings

Proposed, Planned and On-hold buildings

Cancelled buildings

Timeline of tallest buildings of Mangalore

Scenario
Mangalore has been making rapid progress in the real estate industry, especially when it comes to tall and luxurious buildings. Contrary to the all-Indian trend of skyscrapers coming up only in highly populated Metropolitan cities and their neighbourhoods, this not-so-populous city in Karnataka also seems to have jumped into the fray. Mangalore has over 30 completed and topped out buildings taller than 20 floors. A few more are already under construction, and many more are in the pipeline. The skyline of the city has undergone many changes in the past decade, and is all set to change drastically in the coming years.

Bhandary Vertica (56 storeys) and Westline Signature (61 storeys), two under construction skyscrapers in Kadri and Nanthoor, in the city, respectively, are poised to be the tallest towers in Southern India. Most of the present highrises in the city are concentrated around the CBD and also in the Kadri-Bejai region. The Kadri-Bejai belt is turning out to be the "Manhattan of Mangalore", with a lot of highrises being constructed and planned in the region. The present skyline of Mangalore is extensively likened to that of Mumbai in the 1980s.

Another interesting fact about the highrises of Mangalore is that all buildings with 18 or more floors (or 60 or more meters in height) have a helipad, complying with the safety norms set by the local administration. However, the building K2 (with 20 floors) does not have a helipad, since it was constructed before this rule was formed. However, the requirement has changed recently, as service floors are being used as an alternative for helipads.

Trivia
Tallest completed building - Planet SKS - 140 meters
Completed building with the most number of floors - Planet SKS - 40 floors - (3 basements + ground floor + 36 upper floors)
Tallest building under construction - Westline Signature - 208 meters
U/C building with the most number of floors - Westline Signature - 61 floors (3 basements + ground floor + 56 upper floors + terrace floor) 
Completed building with the most number of apartments - Brigade Pinnacle - 414 flats
U/C building with the most number of apartments - Rohan City - 546 apartments 
Building with the largest residential space - Planet SKS - 801265 square feet (74439.91 sq m)
Project with the most number of flats - Northern Sky City - 672 flats in 3 towers (one tower is still U/C)
Tallest hotel - Deepa Grandeur - 25 floors (U/C)
Tallest villament tower - Bhandary Vertica 56 floors (U/C)
First building with helipad - Inland Windsors
First true skyscraper (150m+ as per international definition) - Westline Signature
First centrally air - conditioned skyscraper - Westline Signature (U/C)
First centrally air - conditioned highrise - Landmark Grand City
Building with the longest rooftop swimming pool - Westline Signature (U/C)
First platinum rated green building (skyscraper) - Westline Signature (U/C)

See also
 List of tallest buildings in India
 List of tallest buildings in Bangalore

References

External links
 Diagram of India's skyscrapers - current, proposed, and under construction

Mangalore
Tallest buildings
Tallest buildings in Mangalore